Winnifred Hudson (1905–1996) was a British-born painter who lived most of her life in Hawaii.  She was born in Sunderland, England on May 21, 1905.  At the age of six, she moved with her family to Alberta, Canada, where she grew up.  In 1932, she came to Hawaii on a vacation and liked it so much that she moved to Honolulu in 1934.  Hudson worked as a secretary and took courses at the Honolulu Academy of Arts.  At age 60, she quit her job to become a full-time artist.  In 1995, at age 90, she left Hawaii to live near her family in California.  She died in Davis, California on May 10, 1996.

Although also making prints and collages, Hudson is best known for her hard-edge abstract paintings with a tenuous relationship to nature.  Plant Life and Light, in the collection of the Honolulu Museum of Art, is an example of how the artist subtly references nature in an otherwise abstract painting.  The Hawaii State Art Museum and the Honolulu Museum of Art are among the public collections holding work by Hudson.

References
 Hartwell, Patricia L. (editor), Retrospective 1967-1987, Hawaii State Foundation on Culture and the Arts, Honolulu, Hawaii, 1987, p. 38
 Morse, Morse (ed.), Honolulu Printmakers, Honolulu Academy of Arts, Honolulu, Hawaii, 2003, p. 61
 Yoshihara, Lisa A., Collective Visions, 1967-1997, Hawaii State Foundation on Culture and the Arts, Honolulu, Hawaii, 1997, 119

Footnotes

Hawaii artists
Painters from Hawaii
1905 births
1996 deaths
British emigrants to the United States